The Iglehart House was a historic home located in Columbia, Maryland, Howard County, Maryland, now part of the Rouse Company land development.

The Iglehart house was a two bay wide, two and a half bay stucco covered stone house. The stone structure matched construction style of the nearby Hickory Ridge. The house stood on a 113-acre property which was part of an original land grand named "Joseph's gift". The Iglehart family was prominent in Howard county leadership in the early 1800s in the antebellum era of tobacco slave plantations. The farm was later owned by Peter Johnson In 1978, the property was recommended for inclusion in the National Register of Historic Places for its historic architecture and excellent condition. Howard Research and Development purchased the property, subdivided the farm and demolished the structure to build an Exxon gas station.

See also
List of Howard County properties in the Maryland Historical Trust
Simpsonville, Maryland

References

Columbia, Maryland
Howard County, Maryland landmarks
Houses in Howard County, Maryland
Houses completed in 1846